Sharpe's starling (Pholia sharpii) is a species of starling in the family Sturnidae. It is found in Burundi, the Democratic Republic of the Congo, Ethiopia, Kenya, Rwanda, South Sudan, Tanzania, and Uganda. It is monotypic in the genus Pholia.

The common name and Latin binomial name commemorate the British zoologist Richard Bowdler Sharpe.

References

Sturnidae
Birds of East Africa
Birds described in 1898
Taxonomy articles created by Polbot
Taxobox binomials not recognized by IUCN